Gregory Russell Paulus (born July 3, 1986) is an American basketball coach and former player who is the head coach of the Niagara Purple Eagles men's basketball team. He previously served as an assistant basketball coach for Louisville, Ohio State, and George Washington University. Paulus is a former multi-sport athlete, playing college basketball as a point guard on the Duke University men's team and later football at Syracuse University.

Biography
Greg Paulus was born in Medina, Ohio, and grew up in Appleton, Wisconsin, before moving to the Syracuse suburb of Manlius, New York.  He has six siblings:  David, Matt, Dan, Chris, Mike, and Sarah.  He was named Gatorade Athlete of the Year due to his accomplishments in football and basketball. Paulus was the quarterback of the 2004 Christian Brothers Academy football team, which won the New York State Championship by defeating New Rochelle High School and Ray Rice 41–35 in the title game at the Carrier Dome in Syracuse. Paulus was also named New York State Mr. Basketball following his senior season at CBA.  He was ranked as the number one recruit out of high school.

College basketball
Paulus received scholarship offers to play football at the University of Miami and Notre Dame. He also received basketball scholarship offers from Duke, Syracuse, Georgetown, Florida, and North Carolina. He chose to play basketball and joined the Duke Blue Devils.

Freshman
Games: 36, PPG: 6.7, RPG: 2.8, APG: 5.2

Paulus was a member of the Duke team that finished with a 32–4 record and won the Atlantic Coast Conference (ACC) regular season and tournament championship. Paulus led the ACC in assists per game at 5.2. He set a Duke freshman record for assists in a game with 15 (with three turnovers) in a 104–77 home victory over Valparaiso on December 18, 2005; that assist total was only one away from the all-time single-game Duke record of 16, set by NCAA career assist leader Bobby Hurley. He was selected for the All-America freshman 2nd team.

His 187 assists ranked third behind Bobby Hurley (288 in 1990) and Jay Williams (220 in 2000) among the freshman assist leaders in Duke history.

Sophomore
Games: 33, PPG: 11.8, RPG: 2.2, APG: 3.8, FG%: 45.6

Paulus injured his foot during the preseason. After the season, associate coach Chris Collins said Paulus struggled because he had a tarsal coalition, and it was corrected through surgery; he has since fully recovered. He had a career-high on March 15, 2007 with 25 points against Virginia Commonwealth.

Junior
Games: 34, PPG: 11.4, RPG: 2.1, APG: 3.2

Paulus led Duke to a 28–6 record including an 89–78 victory over rival UNC in which Paulus led Duke in scoring with 18 points. Paulus led the Atlantic Coast Conference in assist to turnover ratio during the 2007–08 season, and shot over 42 percent from beyond the arc on his way to making 82 three point field goals.

Senior

After being the starting point guard for three years, Paulus started only five games during his senior season. Paulus averaged 16 minutes a game, in part due to the development of sophomore guard Nolan Smith.

Football
Paulus announced on May 14, 2009, that he would play college football at Syracuse University.  Paulus was named the starting quarterback for the 2009 season.

He won four games and lost eight during his lone season at Syracuse, completing 67.7 percent of his passes and throwing for 2,025 yards and 13 touchdowns, and threw a school and Big East record 5 interceptions in one game against South Florida.

Professional career
Paulus tried out with the New Orleans Saints in May 2010. Contrary to initial reports, he was not offered a contract. He got another shot with the Saints in June 2010 when he was again invited to minicamp.

Coaching career
Paulus was hired as an assistant basketball coach at Navy in August 2010.

Paulus was hired as the basketball video coordinator for Ohio State University in May 2011. Paulus was promoted to assistant coach for Ohio State University in the summer of 2013

In the fall of 2017, Paulus left Ohio State and was hired to be an assistant coach for the Louisville Cardinals under interim head coach David Padgett. Paulus was not retained for assistant under new Louisville head coach Chris Mack following the end of the season.

Paulus was then hired as an assistant coach for the George Washington Colonials men's basketball for the 2018–2019 season and following this season, he returned to New York State and joined the Niagara Purple Eagles men's basketball team to be an assistant coach on Patrick Beilein's staff. On October 24, 2019, Paulus was named Niagara's interim head coach after Beilein resigned for "personal reasons". It was later announced that Paulus would become the permanent head coach.

Head coaching record

Awards and honors
Awards are for basketball unless otherwise noted.
Gatorade Male Athlete of the Year (all sports)
2005 Gatorade New York state Player of the Year
Four-time all-state
All-America status in 2005 according to McDonald's, Parade, EA and Student Sports
New York State Mr. Basketball as a senior
National High School Coaches Association senior athlete of the year
2004 Gatorade National Football Player of the Year
USA Basketball Junior National Select team for the 2005 Nike Hoops Summit
2005–06 Freshman All-America Second Team
2006 ACC All-Tournament Second Team
2007-08 Third team All-ACC selection
2008 Third Team Academic All-America
2009 Third Team Academic All-America
Three-time ACC All-Academic team

See also
 2009 NCAA Men's Basketball All-Americans

References

External links

Syracuse Orange bio
ESPN profile
Duke Blue Devils bio

1986 births
Living people
American football quarterbacks
American men's basketball coaches
American men's basketball players
Basketball coaches from New York (state)
Basketball coaches from Ohio
Basketball players from New York (state)
Basketball players from Ohio
College men's basketball head coaches in the United States
Duke Blue Devils men's basketball players
George Washington Colonials men's basketball coaches
Louisville Cardinals men's basketball coaches
McDonald's High School All-Americans
Navy Midshipmen men's basketball coaches
Niagara Purple Eagles men's basketball coaches
Ohio State Buckeyes men's basketball coaches
Parade High School All-Americans (boys' basketball)
People from Manlius, New York
People from Medina, Ohio
Point guards
S.I. Newhouse School of Public Communications alumni
Sportspeople from Greater Cleveland
Syracuse Orange football players